The fifth season of Saturday Night Live, an American sketch comedy series, originally aired in the United States on NBC between October 13, 1979, and May 24, 1980.

Cast
Dan Aykroyd and John Belushi left the show at the end of season 4, leaving a void in the cast that most fans thought would be the beginning of the end of the late-night sketch comedy show. 

To keep the show going, Lorne Michaels upgraded many of the show's writers to featured cast member status: Peter Aykroyd (Dan's brother), Jim Downey, Brian Doyle-Murray (Bill's brother), Don Novello (also credited as Father Guido Sarducci), Tom Schiller and Alan Zweibel. Band leader Paul Shaffer also joined the cast, becoming the first person from the SNL band to become a cast member. Harry Shearer joined the show as a featured cast member and was promoted to repertory status during the season.

This season was the first to have two members of the same family as cast members (Bill Murray and Brian Doyle-Murray).

This would be the final season for everyone in the cast. Tom Davis and Jim Downey would return to the show in future seasons as writers. Al Franken, Brian Doyle-Murray, Don Novello and Harry Shearer would rejoin the cast in future seasons (Al Franken would also return as a writer).

Cast roster
Repertory players
Jane Curtin
Garrett Morris
Bill Murray
Laraine Newman
Gilda Radner
Harry Shearer (first episode: October 20, 1979; upgraded to repertory status: February 9, 1980)
Featured players
Peter Aykroyd (first episode: January 26, 1980)
Tom Davis
Jim Downey (first episode: January 26, 1980)
Brian Doyle-Murray (first episode: January 26, 1980)
Al Franken
Don Novello
Tom Schiller (first episode: April 19, 1980)
Paul Shaffer (first episode: November 17, 1979)
Alan Zweibel (first episode: April 19, 1980)

bold denotes Weekend Update anchor

Featured cast members announced and shown during the "Opening Introductions" varied from week to week, as noted below in each episode's description.

Writers

As previously mentioned, Michaels upgraded many of the show's writers to cast member status, including Aykroyd, Downey, Doyle-Murray, Novello, Schiller and Zweibel. Doyle-Murray would be the only one to return, as a writer, in the following season.

This season's writers were Peter Aykroyd, Anne Beatts, Tom Davis, Jim Downey, Brian Doyle-Murray, Al Franken, Tom Gammill, Lorne Michaels, Matt Neuman, Don Novello, Sarah Paley, Max Pross, Herb Sargent, Tom Schiller, Harry Shearer, Rosie Shuster and Alan Zweibel. The head writer was Herb Sargent.

Episodes

Home media
SNL's fifth season was released on DVD on December 1, 2009. There are no plans to release any further seasons.

References

05
Saturday Night Live in the 1970s
Saturday Night Live in the 1980s
1979 American television seasons
1980 American television seasons